Sarah Jane Smith: Snow Blind is a Big Finish Productions audio drama based on the long-running British science fiction television series Doctor Who. It stars Elisabeth Sladen reprising her role as Sarah Jane Smith.

Plot 
Sarah Jane travels to Antarctica to visit Will Sullivan, Harry Sullivan's brother, and his science research team — unaware that one of the team is a murderer. The Crimson Chapter are secretly using the Antarctic base as a front for their fundraising activities, and the Keeper is manipulating events to lure Sarah Jane to a lonely spot in order to ensure her death.

This story is a sequel to Buried Secrets.

Cast
Sarah Jane Smith – Elisabeth Sladen
Josh Townsend – Jeremy James
Will Sullivan – Tom Chadbon
Munro – Nicholas Briggs
Morgane – Julia Righton
Jack – Jack Galagher
Newsreader – Shaun Ley
Ben Kimmel- Jon Weinberg
Keeper – Jacqueline Pearce
Dexter – David Gooderson
Sir Donald – Stephen Greif

Notes 
 Both Tom Chadbon and David Gooderson appeared in Fourth Doctor serials produced in 1979. Chadbon played Duggan in City of Death while Gooderson was the second actor to play Davros, the creator of the Daleks, in Destiny of the Daleks.
 Tom Chadbon, in addition to appearing in the Doctor Who serial City of Death with Tom Baker, also appeared in the Colin Baker television serial The Mysterious Planet (episodes 1 to 4 of The Trial of a Time Lord) in 1986. For Big Finish, Chadbon has also appeared with 8th Doctor Paul McGann, during The Eighth Doctor Adventures (2007), in the serial No More Lies. His science fiction credits include appearing in the BBC tv series Blake's 7, as Del Grant in the series 2 episode Countdown. He is also famous for playing Sandra's husband in the long running BBC situation comedy The Liver Birds.
 David Gooderson has extensive acting credits in television and radio going back forty years. He has twice been a member of the BBC Radio Drama Company, and has made over four hundred broadcasts. His science fiction credits outside Doctor Who include appearing in two cult radio shows: playing Tidy, the sentient android, in series 2 of Earthsearch; and the barman in The Hitchhiker's Guide to the Galaxy. 
 Jacqueline Pearce appeared in Doctor Who with Colin Baker and Patrick Troughton, in the tv serial The Two Doctors. Her science fiction credits include appearing in the BBC tv series Blake's 7 from 1978 to 1981, as series regular Supreme Commander Servalan.
 Stephen Greif's science fiction credits include appearing in the BBC tv series Blake's 7 in 1978, as series regular Space Commander Travis.

Trivia
Harry Sullivan is still said to be missing.

External links
Big Finish Productions – Sarah Jane Smith: Snow Blind

Snow Blind
2006 audio plays
Plays by David Bishop